Bommeria elegans is a species of ferns, native to Mexico.

References

External links 
 

 Bommeria elegans at The Plant List
 Bommeria elegans at Tropicos

Pteridaceae
Plants described in 1990
Endemic flora of Mexico